Under the Skin is the fourth solo album by American musician and Fleetwood Mac vocalist/guitarist Lindsey Buckingham, released on October 3, 2006. The album, long delayed by Fleetwood Mac's reunion tour in the 1990s and 2003 album Say You Will, was his first solo release in 14 years. Under the Skin peaked at #80 on the Billboard 200 album chart in October 2006. "Show You How" was also released as a single but failed to chart.

Music
Predominantly an acoustic album, the album does not feature many instruments besides acoustic guitar and percussion. "Down on Rodeo" and "Someone's Gotta Change Your Mind" are the only two songs on the record with contributions from outside musicians, John McVie on bass and Mick Fleetwood on percussions and drums. Those two songs, along with "To Try for the Sun", were originally recorded ten years prior at Ocean Way Studios in Hollywood, which would have appeared on Buckingham's aborted 1990s solo album Gift of Screws. Other songs from this unreleased project appeared on Fleetwood Mac's Say You Will and Buckingham's 2008 solo release Gift of Screws.

Track listing
All songs composed by Lindsey Buckingham except where noted.

Personnel 
Main Performer
 Lindsey Buckingham – vocals, guitars, bass, keyboards, percussion

Additional personnel
 John McVie – bass (9)
 Mick Fleetwood – drums (9, 10), percussion (9, 10)
 David Campbell – orchestration (10)

Production 
 Lindsey Buckingham – producer, recording (1-8, 11), mixing (1-8, 11), additional photography 
 Rob Cavallo – producer (9, 10)
 Ken Allardyce – recording (9, 10)
 Mark Needham – mixing (9, 10)
 Brian Gardner – mastering 
 Bernie Grundman Mastering (Hollywood, California) – mastering location 
 Frank Ockenfels III – photography 
 Stephen Walker – art direction 
 Tony Dimitriades – management 
 Robert Richards – management

Music promo videos
Three promotional music videos were shot for Under The Skin, these included "It Was You", "Show You How" and "Shut Us Down. Both "It Was You" and "Show You How" are available for digital download via iTunes, but the video for "Shut Us Down" remains unavailable.

References 

Lindsey Buckingham albums
2006 albums
Albums produced by Lindsey Buckingham
Albums produced by Rob Cavallo
Reprise Records albums